This is an incomplete list of ghost towns in South Carolina.

 Andersonville
 Dorchester
 Dunbarton
 Ellenton
 Ferguson
 Hamburg
 Hawthorne
 Leigh
 Meyers Mill
 Mettzendorf
 Newell
 Robbins

Notes and references

 
South Carolina
Ghost towns